Smiltene Municipality is a municipality in Vidzeme, Latvia. The municipality was formed in 2009 by merging the town of Smiltene with the rural parishes of Bilska, Blome, Branti, Grundzāle, Launkalne, Palsmane, Smiltene and Variņi. During the 2021 Latvian administrative reform, the previous municipality was merged with Ape Municipality and Rauna Municipality.

The administrative centre is in the town of Smiltene. The population in 2020 was 11,985.

Geography
Smiltene Municipality is located in the northern part of the Vidzeme Highland on the banks of the river Abuls (Abula). The largest natural lake is Lake Klievezers (3.3 ha) in the southern part of the municipality. In the municipality there are three artificial lakes (reservoirs) created on the river. The largest (10 ha) and most popular is  just east of the town.

History
In 1904, Baltic German Count Paul Lieven (Pauls Līvens) built the first hydroelectric power plant in the Baltics on Lake Teperis.

Twin towns — sister cities

Smiltene is twinned with:

 Donnery, France
 Drohobych, Ukraine
 Lviv, Ukraine
 Navapolatsk, Belarus
 Pincara, Italy
 Písek, Czech Republic
 Porkhov, Russia
 Pustomyty, Ukraine
 Rovigo, Italy
 Steinkjer, Norway
 Wiesenbach, Germany
 Willich, Germany

Symbols 
The coat of arms and the flag used until the 2021 administrative reform were abolished after the changes in the boundaries of the municipality, with new sketches presented for an online vote in August 2022. The sketches will need to be approved by the Heraldry Commission of Latvia before use.

See also
 Administrative divisions of Latvia

References

 
Municipalities of Latvia
Vidzeme